A nova is an exploding star.

Nova or NOVA may also refer to:

People with the name

Single name
 Nova (singer), a Puerto Rican reggaeton and hip hop singer, part of duo Nova & Jory
 Nova (wrestler), ring name of American pro wrestler Mike Bucci
 Nova, stage name of Shaheeda Sinckler, winner of the 2020 Scottish Album of the Year Award

Given name

 Nova Arianto (born 1978), Indonesian professional footballer of Tionghoan descent
 Nova Meierhenrich (born 1973), German television presenter
 Nova Miller (born 2001), Swedish singer, dancer, actress, and multi-instrumentalist
 Nova Peris (born 1971), Aboriginal Australian athlete and former politician
 Nova Pilbeam (1919-2015), British actress
 Nova Ren Suma (born 1975), American #1 New York Times best selling author of young adult novels

Surname
 Aldo Nova (born 1956), Canadian musician
 Debi Nova, stage name of Costa Rican singer-songwriter Deborah Nowalski Kader (born 1980)
 Erika Nõva (1905–1987), Estonian architect
 Heather Nova (born 1967), Bermudan singer, songwriter and poet
 Iván Nova (born 1987), Dominican baseball player
 Stella Nova (1960–2010), British guitarist

Places

Iran
 Nova, East Azerbaijan
 Nova, Semnan

United States
 Nova, Ohio
 Northern Virginia

Elsewhere
 Nova, Africa, former Ancient city and Roman bishopric, now in Tunisia and a Latin Catholic titular see
 Nõva (disambiguation), several places in Estonia
 Nova, Hungary

Arts, entertainment and media

Fictional entities
 Nova (fairy), a fictional character on the U.S. TV series Once Upon a Time
 Nova (Planet of the Apes), a fictional character in Planet of the Apes
Nova (StarCraft), a fictional character in the StarCraft series and Heroes of the Storm
 Nova (Frankie Raye), a Marvel Comics superhero and a Herald of Galactus
 Nova (Richard Rider), a Marvel Comics superhero, the original Nova and leader of the Nova Corps
 Nova (Sam Alexander), a Marvel Comics Superhero, the teenage member of the Nova Corps
 Nova Forrester, a fictional character in Star Blazers
 Nova (Ultra monster)
 Nova 6, a fictional biochemical weapon in Call of Duty: Black Ops
 NOVA, a Kirby Super Star character
 Nova, a Magic Knight Rayearth character
 Nova, a Super Robot Monkey Team Hyperforce Go! character
 Weapon of Mass Destruction Nova, a Mirai Sentai Timeranger character

Games
 N.O.V.A. Near Orbit Vanguard Alliance, a 2009 video game

Literature
 Nova (novel), by Samuel R. Delany
 Nova 1 through Nova 4, anthologies of original science fiction edited by Harry Harrison
 Nova Awards, UK science fiction award
 The Nova Trilogy, a series of novels by William S. Burroughs

Music

Artists
 Nova (Bangladeshi band), a psychedelic, progressive and hard rock band in Bangladesh, formed in 1986 in Dhaka
 Nova (Dutch band), a Dutch electronic music band featuring Rob Papen, also known as Peru
 Nova (Italian band), an Italian progressive rock/jazz fusion band formed in 1975
 Nova (Swedish band), a Swedish pop music band that participated in the Eurovision Song Contest 1973

Albums and songs
 Nova (Atargatis album), 2007
 Nova (Rajaton album), 2000
 "Nova" (The Sound of Arrows song), a single by Swedish duo The Sound of Arrows
 Nova (RL Grime album), 2018

Periodicals
 Nova (Brazilian magazine), a monthly feminine magazine published by Abril and part of the international Cosmopolitan group
 Nova (UK magazine), a British magazine, 1965–75
 Nova Science Fiction, a Swedish magazine for science fiction
 Nova, a weekly Indonesian feminine tabloid, 1988–2023

Radio
 Nova (radio network), a group of Australian radio stations
 Nova M Radio, an American radio network
 Radio Nova (disambiguation), several radio stations

Television

Television channels
 Nova TV (disambiguation), various television channels

Television series
 Nova (Dutch TV program), a current-events program
 Nova (American TV program), an American science documentary series on PBS

Organizations

Companies
 Nova Bus, a Canadian bus manufacturer
 Nova Chemicals, a company headquartered in Calgary, Alberta, Canada
 Nova Energy, a subsidiary of New Zealand company Todd Corporation
 Nova Entertainment, an Australian company
 Nova (Greece), a Greek telecommunications company
 Nova (Iceland), an Icelandic telecommunications company
 Nova Information Systems, former name of credit card transaction firm Elavon
 Nova Performance Paragliders, an Austrian paraglider manufacturer
 Nova Systems, Australian engineering and technology company who run the Peterborough, South Australia#Nova Systems Space Precinct

Political parties
 New Majority (Slovakia)
 New Serb Democracy, Montenegro
 New Party (Serbia)

Other entities
 Nova – Center for Social Innovation, Spain
 Nova Group (metros), multinational collection of metro systems focusing on international benchmarking, based in London, UK
 NOVA-MBA Association, the global association of Italian MBAs

Science and technology
 NOVA (filesystem), a Linux filesystem
 NOVA (food classification), system based on the nature, extent and purpose of industrial food processing
 Nova (laser), high-power laser built at the Lawrence Livermore National Laboratory in 1984
 Nova (operating system), a Cuban state-sponsored Linux distribution
 Nova (rocket), a series of proposed rocket designs
 NOνA, a particle physics neutrino experiment in Fermilab
 Data General Nova, a minicomputer first built in 1969
 OpenStack Nova, a distributed computing component
 Nova, a high-altitude ballooning project by CU Spaceflight

Transportation
 SS Nova, a Cypriot cargo ship in service 1969–1971
 Nova, a brand of train cars used by TransPennine Express
 Nova Bus, a Canadian bus manufacturer

Airlines
 Air Nova, a Canadian airline from 1986 to 2001
 Nova Airways, a passenger airline based in Khartoum, Sudan, founded in 2000

Cars
 Nova (kit car)
 Chevrolet Nova, an American car produced 1962–1979 and 1985–1988
 Dacia Nova, a Romanian car produced 1995–2000
 Holden Nova, an Australian car produced 1989–1996
 Lada Nova, a Russian car produced 1982–2015
 Vauxhall Nova, a British car produced 1982–1993

Schools

United States
 Northern Virginia Community College, Virginia, also known as NoVa
 Nova High School (Redding, California), a public high school from 1967 to 1991
 Nova High School, Florida
 Nova Southeastern University, Florida
 The Nova Project, an alternative high school in Washington

Elsewhere
 Nova (eikaiwa), an English language conversation school in Japan
 NOVA University of Lisbon, Portugal, also known as NOVA

Other uses
 Benelli Nova, a pump-action shotgun
 Nova Institution for Women, a Canadian federal women's prison
 Nova Scotia salmon or Nova lox, a variant of lox

See also

 Novum (plural Nova), scientifically plausible innovations used by science fiction narratives
 Novak, a surname and a given name
 Novae (disambiguation)
 Novas (disambiguation)

 Nõva (disambiguation)
 Nove (disambiguation)
 Novi (disambiguation)
 Novo (disambiguation)
 Novus (disambiguation)
 Novy (disambiguation)

English unisex given names